Larry Gantt Craig (June 27, 1916 – May 30, 1992) was an American football player who played running back and defensive back for the Green Bay Packers of the National Football League (NFL) from  to .

In , Craig made a bit of history as one of the first two players ever to be fined by the NFL's league office when commissioner Elmer Layden in August assessed $25 fines on Craig and New York Giants halfback Hank Soar for fighting.

References

1916 births
1992 deaths
People from Six Mile, South Carolina
American football running backs
South Carolina Gamecocks football players
Green Bay Packers players
Players of American football from South Carolina